The 2017 New Zealand general election was held on Saturday, 23 September 2017, to determine the membership of the 52nd New Zealand Parliament. Parliament has 120 seats, and 71 were filled by electorate MPs, with the remaining 49 from ranked party lists. Writ day, i.e. the day when the Governor-General issues a formal direction to the Electoral Commission to hold the election, was set for Wednesday, 23 August 2017. As stipulated in section 127 of the Electoral Act 1993, the writ will set a date by which registered parties must submit a "list of candidates for election to the seats reserved for those members of Parliament elected from lists". Party lists must have been submitted by Monday, 28 August, at noon. On Wednesday, 30 August, the Electoral Commission released details of candidates for election, party lists, and the polling places. This page lists candidates by party, including their ranking on a list.

Incumbent parliamentary parties

ACT Party
ACT New Zealand released its list on 9 July 2017.

Green Party
The Green Party announced its initial list of 46 candidates for member consultation on 2 April 2017. The final list was released on 30 May 2017. On 7 August 2017, Kennedy Graham (originally 8th on the list) and David Clendon (originally 16th) announced that they would remove themselves from the list, following Metiria Turei's admission of historic benefit fraud. On 8 August 2017, Hutt South candidate Susanne Ruthven withdrew citing work commitments. Turei resigned as co-leader and withdrew from the Green Party list on 9 August 2017.

Labour Party
The Labour Party released its list on 2 May 2017.

On 21 March 2017, Labour announced that its sitting Māori electorate MPs would not contest the party list, standing for their electorates only.

Labour announced a revised list on 15 August 2017 following a leadership change.

Māori Party
The Māori Party released its list on 30 August 2017.

National Party
The National Party released its list on 30 July 2017.

New Zealand First

United Future
United Future lodged the following party list with the Electoral Commission.

Other registered parties

Ban 1080
The Ban 1080 Party's list was released on 31 August 2017.

Conservative Party
The following are the Conservative Party candidates for 2017.

Democrats for Social Credit
The New Zealand Democratic Party for Social Credit released a party list.

Internet Party
The following are the Internet Party candidates for 2017.

Legalise Cannabis Party
The following candidates will stand for the Aotearoa Legalise Cannabis Party in 2017.

Mana Movement
Mana Movement's list was released on 31 August 2017.

The Opportunities Party
The Opportunities Party released its list on 28 August 2017.

Outdoors Party
The New Zealand Outdoors Party's list was released on 31 August 2017.

New Zealand People's Party
The New Zealand People's Party lodged the following party list with the Electoral Commission.

References

2017 New Zealand general election
Lists of New Zealand political candidates
Party lists